Harald Hauswald (born 3 May 1954 in Radebeul) is a German photographer.

With Sibylle Bergemann and Ute Mahler, Hauswald was a co-founder of the Ostkreuz photo agency.

Exhibitions
Ostzeit – Stories from a Vanished Country, House of World Cultures, 2009.
Auferstanden aus Ruinen, Pool Gallery, 2009.
 20 Years After German Unification: Critical Perspectives of Berlin Artists, 2010.
 Voll das Leben! / Retrospektive, C/O Berlin Foundation, 2020.

Bibliography
Ostberlin. Die andere Seite einer Stadt in Texten und Bildern. Munich: Piper Verlag, 1987. .  With Lutz Rathenow.
Die bibliophilen Taschenbücher 563. Dortmund: Harenberg-Ed., 1989. . 
Berlin: BasisDruck, 1990. . 
Die DDR wird 50: Texte und Fotografien. Berlin: Aufbau-Verlag, 1998. .  Photography by Hauswald and Arno Fischer, edited by Volker Handloik and Hauswald.
Seitenwechsel: Fotografien, 1979–1999. Berlin: Aufbau-Verlag, 1999. . 
Die dritte Halbzeit: Hooligans in Berlin-Ost. Bad Tölz: Tilsner 2002. .  With text by Klaus Farin.
Ost-Berlin. Leben vor dem Mauerfall / Ost-Berlin: Life before the Wall Fell Berlin: Jaron, 2005.  . With Lutz Rathenow.
Gewendet vor und nach dem Mauerfall: Fotos und Texte aus dem Osten. Berlin: Jaron, 2006. .  With Lutz Rathenow.
Alexanderplatz. Fotografische und literarische Erinnerungen. Berlin: Jaron, 2007. . With texts by Freya Klier.
Stadionpartisanen: Fussballfans und Hooligans in der DDR. Berlin: Neues Leben, 2007. . Photographs by Hauswald and Knut Hildebrandt, text by Frank Willmann.
Ultras, Kutten, Hooligans: Fussballfans in Ost-Berlin. Berlin: Jaron, 2008. . With text by Frank Willmann.
Auferstanden aus Ruinen Deutschland Ost: Fotos aus vier Jahrzehnten. Berlin: Jaron, 2009. . Text by Jutta Voigt.
Ostzeit: Geschichten aus einem vergangenen Land / Ostzeit: Stories from a Vanished Country. Ostfildern: Hatje Cantz, 2010. . Photography by Hauswald et al., texts by Marcus Jauer et al., ed. Jörg Brüggemann.
Die Stadt. Vom Werden und Vergehen / The City: Becoming and Decaying. Ostfildern: Hatje Cantz, 2010. . 
Voll das Leben. 1. Edition, Steidl, 2021. Edited by Felix Hoffmann .

Notes

External links
Hauswald's website
"Harald Hauswald". Artnet.
"Spotlight: Harald Hauswald, the images of others, and the Stasi" by Jörg Colberg, Conscientious, 13 April 2009.

East German photographers
Living people
People from Meissen (district)
1954 births
21st-century German photographers
Photographers from Saxony